Kliszów may refer to the following places in Poland:
Kliszów, Lower Silesian Voivodeship (south-west Poland)
Kliszów, Subcarpathian Voivodeship (south-east Poland)
Kliszów, Świętokrzyskie Voivodeship (south-central Poland)